Donald Gillies  may refer to:
Donald B. Gillies (1928–1975), mathematician and computer scientist
Donald A. Gillies (born 1944), historian of mathematics
Donnie Gillies (born 1951), Scottish footballer

See also
Donald Gillis (disambiguation)